Forensic biology is the application of biology to associate a person(s), whether suspect or victim, to a location, an item (or collection of items), another person (victim or suspect, respectively). It can be utilized to further investigations for both criminal and civil cases. Two of the most important factors to be constantly considered throughout the collection, processing, and analysis of evidence, are the maintenance of chain of custody as well as contamination prevention, especially considering the nature of the majority of biological evidence. Forensic biology is incorporated into and is a significant aspect of numerous forensic disciplines, some of which include forensic anthropology, forensic entomology, forensic odontology, forensic pathology, forensic toxicology. When the phrase "forensic biology" is utilized, it is often regarded as synonymous with DNA analysis of biological evidence.

Disciplines

Brief History of Forensic Science 
The first known briefings of forensic procedures we still use today are recorded to be used as far back as the 7th century, the concept of utilizing fingerprints as a means of identification was first established. By the 17th century, forensic procedures were used to account criminals of guilt charges among other things. Nowadays, autopsies and forensics have skyrocketed not only in popularity but also in technological advances. One of the first men to use such techniques to what we know now as forensics was a man by the name of Alphonse Bertillon. Who in 1879, became the first to evolve a scientific system of personal identification. Through the development of the science of Anthropometry, which involves the series of measurements of the body to help in distinguishing one human individual from another. Another man who not too long after made significant discoveries in the field of forensics was a man named Karl Landsteiner. Karl Landsteiner in the year 1901, discovered that the blood could be grouped into different categories, A, B, AB, and O. Which of course, led to more studies and eventually, a whole new spectrum in the field of not only medicine but also criminology. Dr Leone Lattes himself is also a very well known man who made significant additions into the field of forensics.  In 1915, he discovered a simple procedure to determine the blood group of the dried bloodstains. This technique was adopted for criminal investigation.
Another man was H.O. Albrecht. H.O. in the following years, 1928 to be exact, was a German chemist who developed a chemical solution that is Luminol. The Luminol makes the blood glow. It is useful in detecting the bloodstains at the scene of a crime. Other more important and significant men like Sir Alec Jeffreys are the ones to thank since they are the ones who have shaped forensics into what we know now. In 1984, he developed the DNA fingerprinting technique to examine the variations in the genetic code, which can be used to distinguish one individual from another. Kary B. Mullis was also another man who the world of medicine and criminology should not thank enough. Kary in 1993, he developed the PCR technique that was used to amplify the samples of DNA fragments in-vitro. This technique was useful for amplifying the DNA sample obtained from the scene of a crime in an extremely minute amount, degraded state, and a mixture of body fluids of two or more people. This technique has also gone on to not only solve crimes but also other things like detecting diseases, viruses, and many other dna related subjects.

DNA analysis
DNA, or deoxyribonucleic acid, is one of the most popular pieces of evidence to recover at a crime scene. More often than not, evidence containing DNA is regarded to as biological evidence. With all of the substantial advances that have been made regarding DNA, biological evidence is recognized to be the golden standard in forensic science.

At the scene, biological evidence must be initially visibly recognized. Sometimes this is not always possible and the aid of an alternative light source, or ALS, is required. Once identified as a potential source, presumptive tests are conducted to establish the possibility of the specified biological presence (semen, saliva, blood, urine, etc.). If positive, samples are collected and submitted for analysis in the laboratory, where confirmatory tests and further tests are performed.

DNA analysis has numerous applications such as paternity testing, identifications of unknown human remains, cold case breakthroughs, as well as connecting suspects and/or victims to a piece(s) of evidence, a scene, or to another person (victim or suspect, respectively). Nuclear DNA evidence can be recovered from blood, semen, saliva, epithelial cells and hair (if the root is still intact). Furthermore, Mitochondrial DNA can be recovered from the shaft of hair, bone and the roots of teeth. For most forensic DNA samples, STR analysis of autosomal short tandem repeats is performed in an attempt to individualize the sample to one person with a high degree of statistical confidence.

Laboratory analysis of DNA evidence involves the sample DNA being extracted, quantitated, amplified, and visualized. There are several methods of DNA extraction possible including organic (phenol-chloroform) extraction, Chelex extraction, and differential extraction. Quantitation is commonly conducted using a form of the polymerase chain reaction, known as real-time PCR, quantitative PCR, or qPCR. qPCR is the preferred method of DNA quantitation for forensic cases because it is very precise, human-specific, qualitative, and quantitative. This technique analyses changes in fluorescence signals of amplified DNA fragments between each PCR cycle without needing to pause the reaction or open the temperature-sensitive PCR tubes. In addition to the components necessary for standard a PCR reaction (i.e. template DNA, carefully designed forward and reverse primers, DNA polymerase [usually Taq], dNTPs, and a buffer solution containing Mg2+), qPCR reactions involve fluorescent dye-labelled probes that complement and anneal to the DNA sequence of interest that lies between the two primers. A “reporter” (R) dye is attached at the 5’ end of the fluorescent probe while a “quencher” (Q) dye is attached at the 3’ end. Before the DNA strands are extended by the polymerase, the reporter and quencher are close enough in space that no fluorescence is detected by the instrument (the quencher completely absorbs/masks the fluorescence of the reporter). As the polymerase begins to extend the strand, the 5' end of the probe is degraded by the polymerase due to its exonuclease activity. The reporter dye is released from the 5’ end and is no longer quenched, thus enabling detection of fluorescence. A graph is constructed for the sample DNA comparing the presence of fluorescence (y-axis) to cycle number (x-axis) of the qPCR process. This is then compared to a standard curve of the cycle fluorescence threshold (y-axis) versus the log of known DNA concentrations (x-axis). By comparing the sample data to the standard curve, one may extrapolate the DNA concentration in the sample, which is essential to move forward with PCR amplification and capillary electrophoresis to obtain a DNA profile. DNA profiles are produced in the form of an electropherogram. The obtained profile can be compared to known samples such as those in CODIS in order to identify a possible suspect. Based on known frequencies of the genotype found in the DNA profile, the DNA analyst may place a statistical measure of confidence on DNA match.

Mitochondrial DNA analysis 
Mitochondrial DNA (mtDNA) is used instead of nuclear DNA when forensic samples have been degraded, are damaged, or are in very small quantities. In many cases there may be human remains that are older, sometimes ancient, and the only options for DNA collection are the bone, teeth, or hair of the body. mtDNA is able to be extracted from such degraded samples because its presence in cells is much higher than nuclear DNA. There can be more than 1,000 copies of mtDNA in a cell, while there are only two copies of nuclear DNA. Nuclear DNA is inherited from both the mother and the father but mtDNA is passed down from only the mother to all of her offspring. Due to this type of inheritance, mtDNA is useful for identification purposes in forensic work but can also be used for mass disasters, missing persons cases, complex kinship, and genetic genealogy.

As mentioned, the main advantage of using mtDNA is its high copy number. However, there are a few disadvantages of using mtDNA as opposed to nuclear DNA. Since mtDNA is inherited maternally and passed to each offspring, all members of the maternal familial line will share a haplotype. A haplotype "is a group of alleles in an organism that are inherited together from a single parent". The sharing of this haplotype among family members can cause an issue in forensic samples because these samples are often mixtures that contain more than one DNA contributor. Deconvolution and interpretation of mtDNA mixtures is more difficult than that of nuclear DNA and some laboratories choose not to attempt the process Since mtDNA does not recombine, the genetic markers are not as diverse as autosomal STRs are in the case of nuclear DNA. Another issue is that of heteroplasmy. Heteroplasmy is when an individual has more than one type of mtDNA in their cells. This can cause an issue in the interpretation of data from questioned forensic samples and known samples that contain mtDNA. Having adequate knowledge and understanding of heteroplasmy can help ensure successful interpretation.

There are some ways to improve success of mtDNA analysis. Preventing contamination at all testing stages and using positive and negative controls is a priority. In addition, the use of mini-amplicons can be beneficial. When a sample of mtDNA is severely degraded or has been obtained from an ancient source, the use of small amplicons can be used to improve the success of amplification during PCR. In these cases primers amplifying smaller regions of HV1 and HV2 in the control region of mtDNA are used. This process has been referred to as the 'ancient DNA' approach.

The first use of mtDNA as evidence in court was in 1996 in State of Tennessee v. Paul Ware. There was only circumstantial evidence against Ware so the admittance of mtDNA from hairs found in the victim's throat and at the scene were key to the case.

In 2004, with the help of the National Center for Missing and Exploited Children and ChoicePoint, mtDNA was used to solve a 22-year-old cold case where the nuclear DNA evidence was not originally strong enough. After mtDNA analysis, Arbie Dean Williams was convicted of the murder of 15-year-old Linda Strait, which had occurred in 1982.

In 2012, mtDNA evidence allowed investigators to establish a link in a 36-year-old investigation into the murders of four Michigan children. Hair fibers found on the bodies of two of the children were tested and the mtDNA found to be the same for each sample. For the investigators this was a big break because it meant that the murders were likely connected.

Forensic anthropology
Anthropology is applied to forensics most regularly through the collection and analysis of human skeletal remains. The primary goals of anthropological involvement include identification and aiding in scene reconstruction by determining details regarding the circumstances of the victim's death. In cases where conventional techniques are unable to determine the identity of the remains due to the lack of soft tissue, anthropologists are required to deduce certain characteristics based on the skeletal remains. Race, sex, age and possible ailments can often be determined through bone measurements and looking for clues throughout the skeletal structure.

Forensic botany

Within forensic biology, we have the category of forensic botany. Forensic botany deals with the study of plants, leaves, seeds, and pollen or plant properties (such as anatomy, growth, behavior, classification, population dynamics, and reproductive cycles) that can lead to traces of evidence in crime scenes that would be considered physical evidence. Before a plant can aid the investigations, the plant must be identified first to see if it is from the location that the plant was found. Forensic botany can help investigators by providing a link between an individual and the crime scene by pinpointing the geographical location of missing bodies or estimate where the burial took place. Another way that is used is through the interrogation process where investigators compare the traces that the victim(s) are found and compare to the statements of the suspect(s). Forensic botany can also reveal whether a death is due to suicide, accident, or homicide. Another example of forensic botany aiding investigators is by moss, moss can establish the PMI of a human skeletal, through its growth rate.

Example:

An elderly man fell a steep hillside and was found dead. They concluded that the man did not die because of the fall but from hypertensive heart disease. Forensic botany concluded that fall was approximately 10 m and there was a lane that joined the hill path around 9 m perpendicular form the body. It showed he had leaves on his left hand and sweater. There were also broken bushes in the scene. Forensic scientists who specialize in forensic botany had grabbed five soil samples and some plant samples from the scene. The plant samples were analyzed through optical microscopy, and they also examined the victims' clothing since it did carry some plant elements present. In this, they did a macroscopic and microscopic analysis which were compared to the collected samples on the scene. It's concluded that there was no evidence of struggling caused by another person instead, the elderly man had lost his balance.

Subspecialties In Forensic Botany 
There are subdisciplines within forensic botany examples include forensic palynology (study of pollen and spores) Dendrochronology (study of the growth of rings of trees stems and roots), Lichenology, mycology, and bryology. Palynology for example can produce evidence of decomposition time, location of death, or the time of year. Bryology is the easiest to find evidence since bryophyte (a species of plants) attaches to shoes and clothes easily. Bryophyte useful since even if it is ripped apart or broken down, DNA can still be analyzed. Ways in which DNA can be analyzed is through the microscope or other sophisticated DNA testing.

Forensic ornithology
Bird remains can be identified, first and foremost from feathers (which are distinctive to a particular species at both macroscopic and microscopic levels).

Forensic odontology
Dentistry has helped law enforcement in criminal and civil proceedings by detecting and solving cases. Odontology did not get popular until the 1960s when an interest was brought up by the first instructional program in the United States at the Armed Forces Institute of Pathology. Because of this program, the term "forensic odontology" is now familiar in the dental profession and law enforcement agencies. Odontologists or dentists can use dental science to know a person's identity. Teeth can be used as weapons and therefore leave information about a person. This information is key in recognizing abuse among people of any age.

Forensic pathology
A forensic pathologist is a medical doctor who is an expert in both trauma and disease and is responsible for performing autopsies. He/she applies their extensive knowledge of the human body and possible internal and external inflictions as he/she performs an autopsy, to hopefully ascertain the manner and cause of death. Information derived from the autopsy often greatly assists investigative efforts as well as scene reconstruction.

Forensic toxicology
Forensic toxicology is the use of toxicology and other disciplines such as analytical chemistry, pharmacology and clinical chemistry to aid medical or legal investigation of death, poisoning, and drug use. The primary concern for forensic toxicology is not the legal outcome of the toxicological investigation or the technology utilized, but rather the obtainment and interpretation of results.

Forensic microbiology 
With recent advances in massive parallel sequencing (MPS), or next-generation sequencing (NGS), forensic microbiology has become an increasingly promising area of research. “Initial applications in circumstances of biocrime, bioterrorism and epidemiology are now accompanied by the prospect of using microorganisms (i) as ancillary evidence in criminal cases; (ii) to clarify causes of death (e.g., drownings, toxicology, hospital-acquired infections, sudden infant death and shaken baby syndromes); (iii) to assist human identification (skin, hair and body fluid microbiomes); (iv) for geolocation (soil microbiome or microbiome of bodies of water); and (v) to estimate postmortem interval (thanatomicrobiome and epinecrotic microbial community)”.

Bioterrorism and epidemiology 
“It is important to remember that biological agents that can be used as weapons are often found in the environment. For this reason, it is always difficult to determine whether infections associated with these bioagents are accidental or purposely started”. While not the first, or only, incidence of bioterrorism, perhaps the most notable case in recent memory involved the sending of at least four anthrax-containing envelopes in the United States in September and October 2001. “At least 22 victims contracted anthrax as a result of the mailings: 11 individuals contracted inhalation anthrax, with 5 of these infections resulting in fatalities; another 11 individuals suffered cutaneous anthrax. In addition, 31 persons tested positive for exposure to B. anthracis spores”. However, thanks to advancements in PCR and whole-genome sequencing, scientists were able to collaborate with the FBI and were able to identify the source of the letter spores.

Postmortem analysis 
“Post-mortem microbiology (PMM) aims to detect unexpected infections causing sudden deaths; confirm clinically suspected but unproven infection; evaluate the efficacy of antimicrobial therapy; identify emergent pathogens; and recognize medical errors. Additionally, the analysis of the thanatomicrobiome may help to estimate the post-mortem interval.”. There is currently an extensive amount of research being performed, most notably using the famous “body farms” throughout the United States, to determine if there is a consistent microbial decomposition “clock” that could be used by itself, or in conjunction with other techniques (such as forensic entomology) to help estimate postmortem intervals. One such group has made extensive headway into describing such a microbial clock, and “believes she’s within two to five years of testing her clock in a real crime scene scenario”. However, if a reliable and consistent microbial clock is determined to exist, “it’s too soon to know whether the microbial clock will pass scientific and legal muster,” (Beans) and “a judge would also have to determine that the microbial clock meets the standard for admission of expert testimony”.

Water sample analysis 
In cases involving a body of water at or near the scene of a crime, a sample of the water can be extracted and analyzed under a light microscope for microorganisms. One such microorganism that are analyzed within samples of fresh water are diatoms, microscopic algae of varying shapes. Different bodies of water have been found to contain unique sets of diatoms and therefore, a piece of evidence found in a specific body of water will contain unique diatoms on it found only in that specific body of water. Therefore, the diatoms on a questioned object or body can be compared to the diatoms from a body of water to determine whether it had been present in the water.

Current issues

Sexual assault kit backlog 
Prior to DNA testing, many sexual assault cases could only rely on "he said, she said" and possible witnesses. Even once DNA analysis was available, many sexual assault kits, or SAKs, were never tested and thrown into a backroom or storage facility, only to be forgotten about until discovered. Now that DNA analysis is frequently utilized in the majority of cases, most SAKs are examined and analyzed. However, the issue remains about the preexisting SAKs that have never been tested. A prevalent issue then, that still extends to now, is the absence of funds to actually process and analyze these SAKs. Many districts would dedicate their funds to homicides or more high-profile cases and sexual assaults would be swept to the side. The biggest concern about all of these SAKs, is how to go about processing all of them, especially as more and more are being found each year.

Cold cases 
With the considerable amount of advances in DNA analysis, old, open cases that still have intact evidence can be examined for biological evidence. New profiles are uploaded to CODIS everyday so the base population to search and compare to increases. Biological testing for cold cases, specifically homicides, encounter similar roadblocks as the SAKs - lack of funds or the DNA samples have not been properly stored thus too much degradation has occurred for viable analyses.

Popular culture

In popular culture, forensic biology is frequently portrayed in shows like Law & Order, Hannibal, Bones, CSI, Dexter and Castle. However thanks to Hollywood's depiction of forensic science, the analysis of biological evidence has fallen prey to the CSI Effect, which results in the public's perception of its capabilities being severely distorted and its limits blurred.

See also
 DNA profiling
 Forensic chemistry 
 Forensic science

References

Branches of biology
Biology